The Gen. Samuel Chandler House is a historic house at 8 Goodwin Road in Lexington, Massachusetts.  The two story wood-frame house was built in 1846 to a design by architect Isaac Melvin.  The Italianate style house features a bracketed shallow-pitch roof, and a three-story campanile-style tower with a steeply pitched pyramidal roof and three-part round-arch windows with balconies at its top level.  A hip-roof porch with arch-forming brackets extends along one side.

The house was listed on the National Register of Historic Places in 1977.

See also
National Register of Historic Places listings in Middlesex County, Massachusetts

References

Houses on the National Register of Historic Places in Middlesex County, Massachusetts
Houses in Lexington, Massachusetts
Houses completed in 1846